Baima is a town in Baxoi County, Chamdo Prefecture of the Tibet Autonomous Region of the People's Republic of China. It lies at an altitude of 3,772 metres (12,378 ft). , it administers Baima Residential Community and the following eight villages:
Yoiba Village
Zhubba Village
Nairab Village
Rixi Village
Wanbêb Village
Samar Village
Dêngka Village
Xaiba Village

See also
List of towns and villages in Tibet

Notes

Populated places in Chamdo
Baxoi County
Township-level divisions of Tibet